The Milwaukee Road's class ES-1 comprised a single electric switcher locomotive built in 1915.  It was designed to run on the unique 1,500 V DC electrification in the yard at Great Falls, Montana.  It was originally numbered #10000 and was numbered E85 in March 1939. It was retired in November 1939.

References

General Electric locomotives
1500 V DC locomotives
ES-1
B-B locomotives
Electric locomotives of the United States
Railway locomotives introduced in 1915
Standard gauge locomotives of the United States

Shunting locomotives